Heartbreak Island is a 1995 Taiwanese drama film directed by Hsu Hsiao-ming. The film follows a recently released woman prisoner as she visits her ex who was arrested in the 1979 Kaohsiung Incident but released before her. The film makes extensive use of flashbacks to illustrate the woman's thoughts.

Writing for The New York Times, Stephen Holden wrote: "The mood of Heartbreak Island is so glumly monochromatic that the characters remain at a chilly distance, and the movie remains locked in its own sealed-off sense of despair."

Cast
Vicky Wei as Chen Linlang
Chen Yishan as Chen Linlang (child)
King Jieh-wen as Wang Rong, former dissident, Chen Linlang's former teacher and lover
Chang Ching-ju as An-an, Wang Rong's wife
Wen Ying as Wang Rong's mother
Chang Chiao-ling as Chiao-ling, An-an's younger sister
Tsai Chen-nan as Jin Guang, former dissident who wants to run for president
Lin Ju as former dissident running a night market business
Meng Ting-li as Chen Linlang's ex-classmate and friend
Tien Meng as Chen Linlang's neighbor in the military dependents' village
Lo Bin as Wang Rong's father (flashback)
Wang Hsin-ju as Chen Linlang's mother (flashback)
Chyi Chin as pub singer

Accolades
1995 Cannes Film Festival
 Screened at the Directors' Fortnight parallel section.
1996 International Film Festival Rotterdam
Won—Network for the Promotion of Asian Cinema Award (tied with Nostalgia for Home Country)

References

External links

Films set in Taiwan
Films shot in Taiwan
Taiwanese romantic drama films
1990s Mandarin-language films
Hokkien-language films
Films with screenplays by Kuo Cheng
Films directed by Hsu Hsiao-ming
1995 romantic drama films
1995 films